Wukan is a coastal fishing village in , in the county-level city of Lufeng, Guangdong.

Wukan became internationally notable as the site of the 2011 Wukan protests that resulted in the ousting of the ruling Communist Party of China's local government over allegations of corruption, the appointment of village leaders to positions within the Communist Party, and the holding of democratic elections to elect the new village chief and village council.

See also 

 List of villages in China
 Lufeng
 Protest and dissent in China
 Wukan protests

References

External links
Wukan: China's Democracy Experiment - 6-part documentary by Al Jazeera English

Villages in China
Lufeng, Guangdong